The structure of the Spanish Army as of April 2021 is as follows:

Chief of the Army General Staff 
The Chief of the Army General Staff heads the Spanish Army.

Army Headquarters 
The Army Headquarters is made up of six organizations, which report directly to the Chief of the Army General Staff.

  Army Headquarters, in Madrid
 Army General Staff
 Command, headed by the Deputy Chief of the Army General Staff
 Army General Staff Main Secretariat
 Planning Division
 Operations Division
 Logistic Division
 Cabinet of the Chief of Staff of the Army
  Information Systems, Telecommunications and Technical Assistance Command
 Technical Assistance Sub-directorate
 Information Systems and Telecommunications Sub-directorate
  Signal Regiment No. 22, in Pozuelo de Alarcón (National Signal Infrastructure)
 Signal Battalion I/22, in Pozuelo de Alarcón
 Signal Battalion II/22, in Pozuelo de Alarcón
 Signal Battalion III/22, in Seville
 Signal Battalion IV/22, in Barcelona
 Signal Battalion V/22, in A Coruña
 Signal Battalion VI/22, in Santa Cruz de Tenerife
 Signal Battalion Support VII/22, in Pozuelo de Alarcón
 Cyberspace and Electromagnetic Activities Sub-directorate
  Electronic Warfare Regiment No. 32, in Dos Hermanas
 Electronic Warfare Battalion I/32
 Electronic Warfare Battalion II/32
 Electronic Warfare Battalion III/32
  Army Geographical Center, in Madrid
  Military History and Culture Institute, in Madrid
 Historical Studies Sub-directorate
 Historical and Cultural Heritage Sub-directorate
 Army Museum
 Military History and Culture Centers
 Military Archives
 Army Legal Council
 Army Intervention Delegate (Financial controlling, part of the Defense Main Intervention Office)
  Infantry Regiment "Inmemorial del Rey" No. 1, in Madrid
  Battalion "Guardia Vieja de Castilla" ("Old Guards of Castille")
  Automobile Unit
  Support and Security Unit
  Music Unit
 Services Unit

Operational Force 
The Operational Force is made up of three organizations, which report directly to the Chief of the Army General Staff.

High Readiness Land Headquarters 
The High Readiness Land Headquarters is one of NATOs Rapid Deployable Corps and headed by a three-star general.

  High Readiness Land Headquarters, in Valencia
  Headquarters Battalion, in Bétera
  Military Police Battalion I, in Bétera

Land Force 
The Land Force is a higher command based in Seville, which is responsible to establish, train and maintain the operational units of the Spanish Army based in continental Spain. The command is headed by a three-star general and has four subordinate units:

  Land Force, in Seville
 Land Force Headquarters, in Seville
  Division "Castillejos", in Huesca
  Division "San Marcial", in Burgos
 Maneuver Support Command, in A Coruña
  Cavalry Regiment "España" No. 11, in Zaragoza
  Light Armored Cavalry Group "Lanceros de Borbón" I/11 (Centauro tank destroyers and VEC-M1 reconnaissance vehicles)
  Light Armored Cavalry Group "Numancia" II/11 (Centauro tank destroyers and VEC-M1 reconnaissance vehicles)

Division "Castillejos" 

The Division "Castillejos" is tasked to organize, equip, prepare and generate operational organizations for joint and combined operations. The division provides forces for NATO, United Nations and European Union missions.

  Division "Castillejos", in Huesca
  Division "Castillejos" Headquarters Battalion, in Huesca
  Signal Regiment No. 1, in Castrillo del Val
 Signal Battalion I/1, in Castrillo del Val
 Signal Battalion II/1, in Huesca

Brigade "Aragón" I 
  Brigade "Aragón" I, in Zaragoza
  Headquarters Battalion I, in Zaragoza
  Armored Regiment "Pavia" No. 4, in Zaragoza
  Tank Battalion "Flandes" I/4 (Leopard 2E tanks)
  Armored Cavalry Group "Húsares de la Princesa" II/4 (Leopard 2E tanks and VEC-M1 reconnaissance vehicles)
  Infantry Regiment "Arapiles" No. 62, in Sant Climent Sescebes
  Mechanized Infantry Battalion "Badajoz" I/62 (Pizarro infantry fighting vehicles)
  Infantry Regiment "Barcelona" No. 63, in Barcelona
  Motorized Infantry Battalion "Cataluña" I/63
  Field Artillery Regiment No. 20, in Zaragoza
  Field Artillery Group I/20 (M109A5 self-propelled howitzers)
  Sapper Battalion I, in Zaragoza
  Logistic Group I, in Zaragoza

Brigade "Rey Alfonso XIII" II of the Legion 
  Brigade "Rey Alfonso XIII" II of the Legion, in Viator
  Headquarters Bandera II of the Legion, in Viator
  Light Armored Cavalry Group "Reyes Católicos" II of the Legion, in Ronda (Centauro tank destroyers and VEC-M1 reconnaissance vehicles)
  Tercio "Juan de Austria" No. 3 of the Legion, in Viator
  Protected Infantry Bandera "Valenzuela" VII/3 (BMR-M1 armored personnel carriers)
  Protected Infantry Bandera "Colón" VIII/3 (BMR-M1 armored personnel carriers)
  Tercio "Alejandro Farnesio" No. 4 of the Legion, in Ronda
  Motorized Infantry Bandera "Millán Astray" X/4
  Field Artillery Group II of the Legion, in Viator (L-118A1 towed howitzers)
  Sapper Bandera II of the Legion, in Viator
  Logistic Group II of the Legion, in Viator

Brigade "Galicia" VII 
  Brigade "Galicia" VII, in Pontevedra
  Headquarters Battalion VII, in Figueirido
  Cavalry Regiment "Farnesio" No. 12, in Santovenia de Pisuerga
  Light Armored Cavalry Group "Santiago" I/12 (Centauro tank destroyers and VEC-M1 reconnaissance vehicles)
  Infantry Regiment "Príncipe" No. 3, in Siero
  Protected Infantry Battalion "San Quintín" I/3 (RG-31 Nyala and VAMTAC ST5 vehicles)
  Protected Infantry Battalion "Toledo" II/3 (BMR-M1 armored personnel carriers)
  Infantry Regiment "Isabel la Católica" No. 29, in Pontevedra
  Motorized Infantry Battalion "Zamora" I/29
  Field Artillery Group VII, in Pontevedra (L-118A1 towed howitzers)
  Sapper Battalion VII, in Pontevedra
  Logistic Group VII, in Pontevedra

Brigade "Guzmán el Bueno" X 
  Brigade "Guzmán el Bueno" X, in Cerro Muriano
  Headquarters Battalion X, in Cerro Muriano
  Infantry Regiment "La Reina" No. 2, in Cerro Muriano
  Protected Infantry Battalion "Princesa" I/2 (M113 armored personnel carriers)
  Mechanized Infantry Battalion "Lepanto" II/2 (Pizarro infantry fighting vehicles)
  Armored Regiment "Córdoba" No. 10, in Cerro Muriano
  Tank Battalion "Málaga" I/10 (Leopard 2E tanks)
  Armored Cavalry Group "Almansa" II/10 (Leopard 2E tanks and VEC-M1 reconnaissance vehicles)
  Infantry Regiment "Garellano" No. 45, in Mungia
  Motorized Infantry Battalion "Guipúzcoa" I/45
  Field Artillery Group X, in Cerro Muriano (M109A5 self-propelled howitzers)
  Sapper Battalion X, in Cerro Muriano
  Logistic Group X, in Cerro Muriano

Brigade "Extremadura" XI 
  Brigade "Extremadura" XI, in Badajoz
  Headquarters Battalion XI, in Badajoz
  Infantry Regiment "Saboya" No. 6, in Badajoz
  Mechanized Infantry Battalion "Cantabria" I/6 (Pizarro infantry fighting vehicles)
  Protected Infantry Battalion "Las Navas" II/6 (M113 armored personnel carriers)
  Armored Regiment "Castilla" No. 16, in Badajoz
  Tank Battalion "Mérida" I/16 (Leopard 2E tanks)
  Armored Cavalry Group "Calatrava" II/16 (Leopard 2E tanks and VEC-M1 reconnaissance vehicles)
  Infantry Regiment "Tercio Viejo de Sicilia" No. 67, in San Sebastián
  Motorized Infantry Battalion "Legazpi" I/67
  Field Artillery Group XI, in Badajoz (M109A5 self-propelled howitzers)
  Sapper Battalion XI, in Badajoz
  Logistic Group XI, in Badajoz

Brigade "Guadarrama" XII 
  Brigade "Guadarrama" XII, in Madrid
  Headquarters Battalion XII, in Madrid
  Infantry Regiment "Asturias" No. 31, in Madrid
  Mechanized Infantry Battalion "Covadonga" I/31 (Pizarro infantry fighting vehicles)
  Protected Infantry Battalion "Uad-Ras" II/31 (M113 armored personnel carriers)
  Armored Regiment "Alcázar de Toledo" No. 61, in Madrid
  Tank Battalion "León" I/61 (Leopard 2E tanks)
  Armored Cavalry Group "Villaviciosa" II/61 (Leopard 2E tanks and VEC-M1 reconnaissance vehicles)
  Field Artillery Group XII, in Madrid (M109A5 self-propelled howitzers)
  Sapper Battalion XII, in  Madrid
  Logistic Group XII, in Colmenar Viejo

Division "San Marcial" 

The Division "San Marcial" is tasked to organize, equip, prepare and generate high readiness operational organizations for joint and combined operations. The division provides forces for high intensity operations and Spanish national missions.

  Division "San Marcial", in Burgos
  Division "San Marcial" Headquarters Battalion, in Burgos
  Information Operations Regiment No. 1, in Valencia
  Information Operations Group I/1
  Information Operations Group II/1

Paratroopers Brigade "Almogávares" VI 
  Paratroopers Brigade "Almogávares" VI, in Paracuellos de Jarama
  Headquarters Battalion VI, in Paracuellos de Jarama
  Cavalry Regiment "Lusitania" No. 8, in Marines
  Light Armored Cavalry Group "Sagunto" I/8 (Centauro tank destroyers and VEC-M1 reconnaissance vehicles)
  Paratroopers Infantry Regiment "Nápoles" No. 4, in Paracuellos de Jarama
  Paratroopers Infantry Bandera "Roger de Flor" I/4
  Protected Infantry Bandera "Roger de Lauria" II/4 (RG-31 Nyala and VAMTAC ST5 vehicles)
  Infantry Regiment "Zaragoza" No. 5, in Alcantarilla
  Protected Infantry Bandera "Ortiz de Zárate" III/5 (BMR-M1 armored personnel carriers)
  Field Artillery Group VI, in Paracuellos de Jarama (L-118A1 towed howitzers)
  Engineer Battalion VI, in Paracuellos de Jarama
  Logistic Group VI, in Paracuellos de Jarama

Special Operations Command "Órdenes Militares" 
  Special Operations Command "Órdenes Militares", in Alicante
  Special Operations Command Headquarters Group, in Alicante
  Special Operations Group "Valencia" III, in Alicante
  Special Operations Group "Tercio del Ampurdán" IV, in Alicante
  Special Operations Bandera "Legionario Maderal Oleaga" XIX of the Legion, in Alicante
  Special Operations Command Logistic Unit, in Alicante
  Special Operations Command Signal Company, in Alicante

Mountain Troops Command 

 Mountain Troops Command, in Pamplona
 Headquarters Battalion, in Pamplona
  Mountain Hunters Infantry Regiment "Galicia" No. 64, in Jaca
  Mountain Hunters Battalion "Pirineos" I/64 (Bv 206s armored vehicles)
  Climbers and Skiers Company 1/64
  Mountain Hunters Infantry Regiment "América" No. 66, in Berrioplano
  Mountain Hunters Battalion "Montejurra" I/66 (Bv 206s armored vehicles)
  Mountain and Special Operations Military School, in Jaca

Army Airmobile Forces 

  Army Airmobile Forces, in Colmenar Viejo
  Army Airmobile Forces Headquarters Battalion, in Colmenar Viejo
  Attack Helicopter Battalion I, in Almagro (Tiger HAD)
  Emergency Helicopter Battalion II, in Bétera and  Colmenar Viejo (AS532 UL Cougar)
  Maneuver Helicopter Battalion III, in Agoncillo (NH90 TTH)
  Maneuver Helicopter Battalion IV, in El Copero (AS332 B1 Super Puma)
  Transport Helicopter Battalion V, in Colmenar Viejo, (CH-47F Chinook)
  Army Airmobile Forces Logistic Group, in Colmenar Viejo
 Melilla Helicopter Detachment, in Melilla

Maneuver Support Command 

The Maneuver Support Command is tasked to organize, equip, prepare and generate operational combat support and combat logistic support organizations for joint and combined operations.

 Maneuver Support Command, in A Coruña
 Maneuver Support Command Headquarters Battalion, in A Coruña
  Intelligence Regiment No. 1, in Valencia
  Intelligence Group I/1
  Terrestrial Reconnaissance Group II/1
  Aerial Reconnaissance Group IV/1 (IAI Searcher MK II J and RQ-11 Raven Unmanned Aerial Vehicles), in San Andrés del Rabanedo
  NBC-defense Regiment "Valencia" No. 1, in Valencia
  NBC-defense Battalion I/1
 Special Equipment Unit

Field Artillery Command 
  Field Artillery Command, in San Andrés del Rabanedo
  Coastal Artillery Regiment No. 4, in San Fernando
  Coastal Artillery Group I/4 (155/52 APU (V07) towed howitzers)
  Field Artillery Regiment No. 11, in Castrillo del Val
  Field Artillery Group I/11 (M109A5 self-propelled howitzers)
  Field Artillery Group II/11 (M109A5 self-propelled howitzers), in San Andrés del Rabanedo
  Rocket Artillery Regiment No. 63, in Astorga
  Rocket Artillery Group I/63 (155/52 APU-SIAC towed howitzers - to be replaced with HIMARS)
  Target Acquisition Group II/63 (ARTHUR and AN/TPQ-36 artillery fire locating radars and IAI Searcher MK II J drones), in San Andrés del Rabanedo

Anti-aircraft Artillery Command 
  Anti-aircraft Artillery Command in Madrid
  Anti-aircraft Artillery Regiment No. 71, in Madrid
  Anti-aircraft Artillery Group I/71 (Mistral surface-to-air missiles)
  Anti-aircraft Artillery Group II/72 (GDF 07 twin 35mm autocannons and Aspide surface-to-air missiles with Skydor fire direction systems)
  Anti-aircraft Artillery Regiment No. 73, in Cartagena
  Anti-aircraft Artillery Group I/73 (GDF 07 twin 35mm autocannons and Aspide surface-to-air missiles with Skydor fire direction systems)
  Anti-aircraft Artillery Group II/73 (NASAMS surface-to-air missile systems)
  Anti-aircraft Artillery Group III/73 (MIM-104 Patriot surface-to-air missile systems), in Marines
  Anti-aircraft Artillery Regiment No. 74, in Dos Hermanas
  Anti-aircraft Artillery Group I/74 (MIM-23 Hawk surface-to-air missile systems)
  Anti-aircraft Artillery Group II/74 (MIM-23 Hawk surface-to-air missile systems), in San Roque
  Maintenance Group III/74
  Anti-aircraft Artillery Command Signal Unit, in Madrid and Dos Hermanas

Engineer Command 
  Engineer Command, in Salamanca
  Engineer Regiment No. 1, in Castrillo del Val
  Sapper Battalion I/1
  Special Engineer Regiment No. 11, in Salamanca
  Road Building Battalion I/11
  Camp Building Battalion II/11
  Bridge and Special Engineer Regiment No. 12, in Zaragoza
  Pontoon Bridge Battalion I/12
  Special Engineer Battalion III/12

Signal Command 
  Signal Command, in Bétera
  Signal Regiment No. 21, in Marines
 Signal Battalion Command Posts I/21
 Signal Battalion Hubs II/21
 Signal Battalion Support III/21
  Electronic Warfare Regiment No. 31, in El Pardo
 Electronic Warfare Battalion I/31
 Electronic Warfare Unit II/31

Logistic Brigade 
  Logistic Brigade, in Zaragoza
  Transport Grouping No. 1, in Madrid
 Special Transport Group I/1
  Deployment Support Group II/1, in Alcalá de Henares
 Harbor terminal units in San Fernando, Los Barrios, Viator and Paterna
  Logistic Support Grouping No. 11, in Colmenar Viejo
  Supply Group I/11
  Maintenance Group II/11
  Services and Workshops Unit 112
  Logistic Support Grouping No. 21, in Seville
  Supply Group I/21
  Maintenance Group II/21
  Transport Group III/21, in Granada
  Services and Workshops Unit 212, in Granada
  Logistic Support Grouping No. 41, in Zaragoza 
  Supply Group I/41
  Maintenance Group II/41
  Transport Group III/41
  Services and Workshops Unit 412, in Sant Boi de Llobregat
  Logistic Support Grouping No. 61, Valladolid
  Supply Group I/61
 Maintenance Group II/61
  Transport Group III/61
  Services and Workshops Unit 612, in Burgos
  Logistic Support Grouping No. 81, in San Cristóbal de la Laguna
  Maintenance Group I/81
 Supply Company No. 1/81
 Transport Company No. 2/81
  Ammunition Battery No. 3/81
  Services and Workshops Unit 812
  Medical Grouping No. 1, in Pozuelo de Alarcón
  Medical Group I/1
  Medical Group II/1
  Medical Group III/1, in Zaragoza
  Medical Group IV/1, in Zaragoza
  NBC Decontamination Station
  Medical Logistic Support Unit, in Madrid

Canary Islands Command 

The Canary Islands Command is a higher command based in Santa Cruz de Tenerife, which is tasked to establish and prepare operational units and tasked to carry out military operations in its assigned area. The command consists of all Spanish Army units outside continental Spain and is headed by a three-star general.

  Canary Islands Command, in Santa Cruz de Tenerife
  Ceuta General Command, tasked with defending the exclave of Ceuta
  Melilla General Command, tasked with defending the exclave of Melilla
  Balearic General Command, tasked with defending the Balearic Islands
  Brigade "Canarias" XVI, tasked with defending the Canary Islands
  Anti-aircraft Artillery Regiment No. 94, in Las Palmas 
  Anti-aircraft Artillery Group I/94 (NASAMS surface-to-air missile systems, Mistral surface-to-air missiles and GDF 07 twin 35mm autocannons with Skydor fire direction systems)
  Maneuver Helicopter Battalion VI, in San Cristóbal de La Laguna (AS332 B1 Super Puma)

Ceuta General Command 
The command is headed by a two-star general.

  Ceuta General Command, in Ceuta
  Ceuta General Command Headquarters Battalion
  Cavalry Regiment "Montesa" No. 3
  Armored Cavalry Group "Cazadores de África" I/3 (Leopard 2A4 tanks and Pizarro infantry fighting vehicles)
  Tercio "Duque de Alba" No. 2 of the Legion
  Protected Infantry Bandera "Cristo de Lepanto" IV/2 (BMR-M1 armored personnel carriers)
  Regulares Group "Ceuta" No. 54
  Motorized Infantry Tabor "Tetuán" I/54
  Mixed Artillery Regiment No. 30
  Field Artillery Group I/30 (155/52 APU-SIAC towed howitzers)
  Anti-aircraft Artillery Group II/30 (Mistral surface-to-air missiles)
  Engineer Regiment No. 7
  Sapper Battalion I/7
  Logistic Unit No. 23

Melilla General Command 
The command is headed by a two-star general.

  Melilla General Command, in Melilla
  Melilla General Command Headquarters Battalion
  Cavalry Regiment "Alcántara" No. 10
  Armored Cavalry Group "Taxdirt" I/10 (Leopard 2A4 tanks and Pizarro infantry fighting vehicles)
  Tercio "Gran Capitán" No. 1 of the Legion
  Protected Infantry Bandera "España" I/1 (BMR-M1 armored personnel carriers)
  Regulares Group "Melilla" No. 52
  Motorized Infantry Tabor "Alhucemas" I/52
  Mixed Artillery Regiment No. 32
  Field Artillery Group I/32 (155/52 APU-SIAC towed howitzers)
  Anti-aircraft Artillery Group II/32 (Mistral surface-to-air missiles)
  Engineer Regiment No. 8
  Sapper Battalion I/8
  Logistic Unit No. 24

Balearic General Command 
The command is headed by a two-star general.

  Balearic General Command, in Palma de Mallorca
  Infantry Regiment "Palma" No. 47, in Palma de Mallorca
  Motorized Infantry Battalion "Filipinas" I/47

Brigade "Canarias" XVI 
  Brigade "Canarias" XVI, in Las Palmas (Gran Canaria)
  Headquarters Battalion XVI, in Las Palmas
  Light Armored Cavalry Group "Milán" XVI, in Marines (Province of Valencia) (Centauro tank destroyers and VEC-M1 reconnaissance vehicles)
  Infantry Regiment "Soria" No. 9, in Puerto del Rosario (Fuerteventura)
  Protected Infantry Battalion "Fuerteventura" I/9 (BMR-M1 armored personnel carriers)
  Infantry Regiment "Tenerife" No. 49, in Santa Cruz de Tenerife
  Motorized Infantry Battalion "Albuera" I/49
  Infantry Regiment "Canarias" No. 50, in Las Palmas
  Protected Infantry Battalion "Ceriñola" I/50 (RG-31 Nyala and VAMTAC ST5 vehicles)
  Field Artillery Regiment No. 93, in San Cristóbal de La Laguna (Tenerife)
  Field Artillery Group I/93 (L-118A1 towed howitzers)
 Mistral Battery (Mistral surface-to-air missiles)
  Sapper Battalion XVI, in San Cristóbal de La Laguna and Las Palmas
  Logistic Group XVI, in Las Palmas

Support Force 
The Support Force is made up of five organizations, which report directly to the Chief of the Army General Staff.

Personnel Command 
The Personnel Command is responsible for the planning, management, administration and control of the army's personnel management, personnel assistance, and healthcare.

  Personnel Command, in Madrid
 Personnel Command Headquarters
 Main Secretariat
  Personnel Directorate
 Military Career Sub-directorate of 
 Evaluation Sub-directorate
 Personnel Management Sub-directorate
  Personnel Assistance Directorate
 Personnel Support Sub-Directorate
 Social Centers Management Sub-Directorate
 Military residences, sport centers, and sociocultural centers
  Healthcare Directorate

Training and Doctrine Command 
The Training and Doctrine Command is responsible for the planning, inspection, coordination and investigation of the army's knowledge management, which includes the doctrine, organization, materials, education and instruction systems, training, and evaluation.

  Training and Doctrine Command, in Granada
 Training and Doctrine Command Headquarters
 Main Secretariat
  Research, Doctrine, Organization, and Materials Directorate
 Doctrine, Organization, and Materials Sub-Directorate
 Research and Lessons Learned Sub-Directorate
  Education, Instruction, Training, and Evaluation Directorate
 Education Sub-directorate
 Instruction, Training and Evaluation Sub-directorate
  General Military Academy, in Zaragoza
  Non-commissioned Officers Basic General Academy, in Talarn
  Infantry Academy, in Toledo
  Cavalry Academy, in Valladolid
  Artillery Academy, in Segovia
  Engineer Academy, in Hoyo de Manzanares
  Logistic Academy, in Calatayud
  Army Aviation Academy, in Colmenar Viejo
  Army War School, in Madrid
  Army Higher Polytechnic School, in Madrid
  Nuclear, Biological and Chemical Defense Military School, in Hoyo de Manzanares
  Troop Formation Center No. 1, in Cáceres
  Troop Formation Center No. 2, in San Fernando
  National Training Center "San Gregorio", in Zaragoza
  National Training Center "Chinchilla", in Chinchilla de Montearagón

Logistic Support Command 
The Logistic Support Command is responsible materiel and logistical support processes, which includes the supply, maintenance and transportation functions and corresponding support engineering.

  Logistic Support Command, in Madrid
 Logistic Support Command Headquarters
 Main Secretariat
 Engineering Command
 Economic Affairs Command
  Procurement Directorate
 Weapon Systems Sub-directorate
 Supplies and Services Sub-directorate
  Logistic Functions Integration Directorate
 Logistic Management Sub-directorate
 Analysis Management Sub-directorate
  Logistic Centers Command
  Supply Depot and Center for Logistics Materiel, in Madrid
  Maintenance Depot and Center for Armored Systems No. 1, in Madrid
  Maintenance Depot and Center for Armored Systems No. 2, in Segovia
  Maintenance Depot and Center for Wheeled Vehicles No. 1, in Torrejón de Ardoz
  Maintenance Depot and Center for Wheeled Vehicles No. 2, in Cordoba
  Maintenance Depot and Center for Artillery Weapons and Materiel, in Valladolid
  Maintenance Depot and Center for Anti-aircraft, Coastal, and Missile Systems, in Pozuelo de Alarcón
  Maintenance Depot and Center for Engineer Materiel, in Guadalajara
  Maintenance Depot and Center for Signal Materiel, in El Pardo
  Maintenance Depot and Center for Helicopters, in Colmenar Viejo
  Maintenance Depot and Center for Hardware and Software Systems, in El Pardo

Army Main Inspectorate 
The Army Main Inspectorate is responsible for the planning, management, administration and control of the army's infrastructures, environmental protection, and occupational hazards prevention. 

  Army Main Inspectorate, in Barcelona 
 Army Main Inspectorate Headquarters
 Main Secretariat
  Quartermaster Directorate, in Madrid (doubles as First Main Sub-inspectorate (Center))
 Second Main Sub-inspectorate (South), in Seville
 Third Main Sub-inspectorate (Pyrenees), in Barcelona
 Fourth Main Sub-inspectorate (Northwest), in Valladolid
 Fifth Main Sub-inspectorate (Canary Islands), in Santa Cruz de Tenerife
  Infrastructure Directorate

Economic Affairs Directorate 
The Economic Affairs Directorate is responsible for the planning, management, administration and control of the financial resources made available to the Army, and also for contracting and accounting. 

  Economic Affairs Directorate, in Madrid 
 Accounting and Budget Sub-directorate
 Economic Management and Contracting Sub-directorate

Graphic overview of the Spanish Army

Geographic distribution of operational forces

See also 
 Structure of the Spanish Army in 1990

References

External links 
 Spanish Army Website

Spanish Army
Spain